Zhang Guoliang (1810 – April 1860), born in Guangdong, was a Field Marshal for the Qing dynasty. He was born in Gaoyao, Zhaoqing, Guangdong, China, although Qing state that he is from Meixian, Guangdong.
He was originally a bandit in Guangxi but later joined the Qing Army. He raised the Green Standard Army by 250,000 to fight against the Taiping Rebellion in the second rout the Army Group Jiangnan in 1860 and was defeated by Li Xiucheng. Zhang served as a minister to the emperor and a vice commander of Army Group Jiangnan until his death by suicide. Zeng Guofan praised Zhang and said he was Jiangnan's "Great Wall of China."

Early life
When the Battle of Nanjing (1853) began, Zhang accepted a SOS order from Nanjing, he and his 15,000 men were the first troops to arrive and save Nanjing.

Nickname
Zhang Guoliang was nicknamed Big head sheep (goose) as a member of the Tiandihui gang and was a bandit with Luo Dagang.  He was said to have the habit of hiding a dagger in his boot.

Recovery of Zhenjiang
In 1856, Zhang GuoLiang led his army in the recovery of Zhenjiang, which had been occupied by Taiping for five years.  The Emperor rewarded Zhang with the Imperial yellow jacket and promoted him to First Class Senior General.

Death
In April 1860, Zhang was defeated and led his remaining 20,000 soldiers in retreat to Danyang.  He left the city on horseback and drowned while trying to escape.  His body was not found immediately; it was eventually buried in the Nanjing Pantheon.

Awards
 Royal BATURU (Manchu:the Brave) in 1853
 Imperial yellow jacket() in 1857
 Baron Yiyong of the First Class, Order of succession 

References
Draft History of Qing
Jiangnan DaYing

1810 births
1860 deaths
Generals from Guangdong
Qing dynasty tidus
Qing military personnel killed in action
People from Zhaoqing
Members of the Green Standard Army
Deaths by drowning